Dourdou may refer to the following rivers:

Dourdou de Camarès, tributary of the Tarn in southern France
Dourdou de Conques, tributary of the Lot in southern France